Ernest Linwood Parker (November 29, 1864 – June 18, 1934) was an American politician from Idaho. He was the 13th lieutenant governor of Idaho. Parker was elected in 1917 along with Governor Moses Alexander. He died in 1934 of complications of diabetes.

Linwood was born in Sigourney, Iowa.

References

Idaho Democrats
Lieutenant Governors of Idaho
1864 births
1934 deaths
People from Sigourney, Iowa